The 1953 Arkansas State Indians football team was an American football team that represented Arkansas State College—now known as Arkansas State University—as an independent during the 1953 college football season. Led by Forrest England in his eighth and final year as head coach, the Indians compiled a record of 8–0–2. They were invited the Tangerine Bowl, where they tied East Texas State.

Schedule

References

Arkansas State
Arkansas State Red Wolves football seasons
College football undefeated seasons
Arkansas State Indians football